Baijiayi, also known as baijiapao and sometimes referred as One hundred families robe, Hundred-Families robe, or One hundred families clothing in English, is a form of Chinese patchwork jacket, particular for male children. The baijiayi is used as a protective talisman for children. It is a traditional Han Chinese custom, which has followed for centuries.

Cultural significance and symbolism 
The baijiayi is a symbol of longevity, and it was one of the ritual procedures of the "One-hundred-day celebration", along with the baijia locks. It is made of donated fabrics, and it was composed of one hundred pieces of fabrics which could be shaped into tessellated squares, triangles, diamonds, rectangles, and hexagons. It could also be embroidered with symbols and motifs which were considered auspicious, such as auspicious clouds, the Chinese zodiac, the bagua and the five poisons.

In the past, due to the lag in health care and education, infant mortality was relatively high. Nevertheless, people believed that an infant's death was due to a ghost. The baijiayi was supposed to protect the child from evil spirits through the use of many donated fabrics of multiple colours. These small pieces of cloth was collected from various local families, which were supposed to represent "hundred families". These pieces of fabrics would symbolize the combined strength of the donators and were believed protect their sons from or ward off evil spirits and ghosts. The mother would receive these pieces of fabrics in order to make the finished baijiayi for her child. The baijiayi could not be taken off until the child reaches one year old.

History

Origins 

People started making Chinese patchwork in the Liu Song of the Southern dynasty. The first emperor of Liu Song Dynasty, named Liu Yu, was born in an underprivileged family. His mother gathered rags from the neighbourhoods to make a patchwork. When he became the emperor, he perceived this kind of patchwork as the symbol for his impoverished childhood. All the infants in Liu’s family had to use the patchwork so that his offspring could know how fortunate they were.  Afterwards, his citizens followed this royal custom to make "Bai jia yi" for their babies.

Other version 
A similar style of clothing to the baijiayi is the shuitianyi.

Gallery

See also 

 List of Hanfu
 Hanfu
 List of Chinese symbols, designs, and art motifs
 Chinese auspicious ornaments in textile and clothing
 Chinese patchwork
 Shuitianyi

References 

Chinese traditional clothing
Chinese folk art
Chinese traditions